Shilton  may refer to:

Places
Shilton, Oxfordshire, England
Shilton, Warwickshire, England
Shilton railway station, a former station

Other
Shilton (surname)
Earl Shilton, a town in Leicestershire, England
Chilton (disambiguation)
Shelton (disambiguation)